The Bouyei (also spelled Puyi, Buyei and Buyi; self called: Buxqyaix,  or "Puzhong", "Burao", "Puman";), otherwise known as the Zhongjia, are an ethnic group living in Southern Mainland China. Numbering 2.5 million, they are the 11th largest of the 56 ethnic groups officially recognized by the People's Republic of China.

The Bouyei mostly live in Qianxinan and Qiannan prefectures of Southern Guizhou Province, as well as in Yunnan and Sichuan Provinces.

Some 3,000 Bouyei also live in Northern Vietnam, where they are one of that nation's 54 officially recognized ethnic groups. In Vietnam, they are located in Mường Khương District of Lào Cai and Quản Bạ District of Hà Giang Province.

Names
The Bouyei consist of various subgroups. Below are their autonyms written in the International Phonetic Alphabet with numerical Chao tones.
, 
, 
, 
, 
, 
, 
, 
, 

Some clans within the Bouyei groups include:
, 
, 
, 

In Congjiang County, Guizhou, there is a group that refer to themselves as "Buyeyi, 布也益", but are officially classified by the Chinese government as ethnic Zhuang.

Distribution

In China by county
County-level distribution of the Bouyei, from the 2000 Chinese census

(Only includes counties or county-equivalents containing >0.1% of China's Bouyei population.)

In Vietnam
Province-level distribution of the Bố Y, from the 2009 Census

Language

The Bouyei speak the Bouyei language, which is very close to Standard Zhuang language. There is a dialect continuum between these two. The Bouyei language has its own written form which was created by linguists in the 1950s based on the Latin alphabet and with spelling conventions similar for the Pinyin system that had been devised to romanise Mandarin Chinese.

History
The Bouyei are the native Tai peoples of the plains of Guizhou. They are one of the oldest peoples of China, living in the area for more than 2,000 years. Prior to the establishment of the Tang dynasty, the Bouyei and Zhuang were linked together; the differences between both ethnic groups grew greater and from year 900 already they were two different groups. The Qing dynasty abolished the system of local heads and commanded in its place to officials of the army which caused a change in the local economy; from then on, the land was in the hands of a few landowners, which caused the population to revolt. During the Nanlong Rebellion(南笼起义) of 1797 led by Wang Nangxian, the Bouyei underwent a strong repression that caused many of them to emigrate to faraway Vietnam.

Culture
Many Bouyei are agricultural farmers who commonly cultivate crops for consumption or sale like rice, millet, wheat, potatoes, maize, cocoa, tea, silk and many other types of crops. The Bouyei have also played a major role as intermediate merchants in the region. Due to changing economies, the Bouyei engage in both small-scale and large-scale commercial or business operations.

Traditional Bouyei handicrafts and batiks are renowned throughout the region. The Bouyei celebrate many festivals, both native and those derived from Han culture. One native festival is called the Ox King's Day(牛王节) on April 8th, an annual celebration meant to honor oxen and their contribution to agricultural activities.
June 6th is an important traditional Buyei holiday for ancestral worship.The story behind this tradition exists.According to Bouyei mythology, after Pangu became an expert in rice farming after creating the world, he married the daughter of the Dragon King, and their union gave rise to the Buyei people.

The daughter of the Dragon King and Pangu had a son named Xinheng. When Xinheng disrespected his mother, she returned to heaven and never came down, despite the repeated pleas of her husband and son. Pangu was forced to remarry and eventually died on the sixth day of the sixth month of the lunar calendar.

Xinheng's stepmother treated him badly and almost killed him. When Xinheng threatened to destroy her rice harvest, she realized her mistake. She made peace with him and they went on to pay their respects to Pangu annually on the sixth day of the sixth month of the lunar calendar.

There are christian churches among the Bouyei ethnic group in China. Most of them are in Guizhou and Yunnan. There is Catholic influence.

Notable Bouyei people
Guo Jian (郭健), artist
Huang Xiaoyun (黃霄雲), singer and actress
Wang Nangxian, leader of the anti-Manchu White Lotus Rebellion
Xiao Sha (肖莎), gymnast

See also
Bouyei churches
List of ethnic groups in China
List of ethnic groups in Vietnam

References

External links

 The Bouyei ethnic minority (government homepage, in English)
  (Bouyei online, in Bouyei and Chinese)
  (Outline of the whole Liao [Rao, Lao, Tai] people)
 Bouyei language page (from Ethnologue site)
  (the forum of Bouyei, in Bouyei and Chinese, the biggest site of Bouyei in China)
 Map share of ethnic by county of China

 
Tai peoples
Ethnic groups officially recognized by China
Ethnic groups in Vietnam